Cap Juluca, A Belmond Hotel, is a five-star resort located on Maundays Bay in Anguilla. Cap Juluca is named for the rainbow spirit of the Arawak, Anguilla's earliest inhabitants. According to local lore, "Juluca" was a mystical being covered with fine colorful feathers who brought luck to fishermen.
The original hotel was located in a white stucco building, with Moorish arches and domes .

References

Hotels in Anguilla
Belmond hotels